Horst Janssen (14 November 192931 August 1995) was a German draftsman, printmaker, poster artist and illustrator. He had a prolific output of drawings, etchings, woodcuts, lithographs and wood engravings.

He first published in the newsweekly  in 1947. In the early 1950s, he started working in lithography, on an initiative of  paper manufacturer Guido Dessauer, using the technical facilities of a coloured paper factory. The first retrospective of Janssen's drawings and graphic works was shown in 1965, first in the  Hanover, then in other German cities and in Basel. In 1966, he was awarded Hamburg's Edwin Scharff Prize. International exhibitions followed. In 1968, he received the Grand Prize in graphic art at the Venice Biennale; in 1977, his works were shown at the documenta VI in Kassel.

The Horst Janssen Museum in his hometown of Oldenburg is dedicated to his legacy. His work is shown internationally in major museums.

His life was marked by numerous marriages, outspoken opinions, alcoholism, and selfless dedication to the art of printmaking.

Early life and education 

Janssen was born in Hamburg. His mother, Martha Janssen, was a dressmaker from Oldenburg; he never knew his father. Janssen was brought up by his mother and grandparents at Lerchenstraße 14, Oldenburg. He was adopted by his grandfather, and following his death, he was adopted by the Guardianship Court in 1939.

In 1942, he became a student at the National Political Institute of Education ( or napola) in Haselünne, Emsland, where an art teacher, Hans Wienhausen, encouraged his artistic talent. His mother died in 1943. In 1944, he was adopted by his mother's younger sister, Anna Janssen, and he moved to Hamburg, where she lived.

First publications 

Janssen's first publication was a drawing in the weekly newspaper  in 1947. The following year he published his first book, the children's book  (Are you all there?), with Rolf Italiaander. In 1950 his first child, son Clemens, was born and he wrote and illustrated his second book,  (The race between the hare and the hedgehog on the Buxtehude Heath), for the birthday of a little girl named Friederike Gutsche. It was published in a facsimile edition in 1973.

Janssen produced his first woodcuts, influenced by Edvard Munch. Dominant themes were animals along with man and woman. In 1952, he received a Lichtwark scholarship in Hamburg. The following year, he was arrested after a drunken brawl and tried for murder. He was found innocent of the charge, but received a suspended sentence for drunkenness.

Lithography 
In the early 1950s, he received a commission from the paper manufacturer Guido Dessauer for a portrait of his father-in-law, the diplomat Friedrich von Keller, followed by other portraits of family members. Janssen was able to create his first lithographs using the technical equipment of the Aschaffenburger Buntpapierfabrik. His early lithographs were shown in 2000 by the Hamburger Kunsthalle. They included "" (Tree Mound; 1957); his first self-portraits, such as "Selbst-innig" (Intimate with Self; 1966) and poster designs, influenced by Ben Shan, for his own exhibitions. Another self-portrait, "" (Self, singing), shows the artist with wide open mouth, as if expressing "" (profound despair about the world and God), according to a reviewer. He changed a lithograph by Oskar Kokoschka, picturing himself upright, the other of two figures kneeling, titled "" (Oskar loves me like that – Yes!). The exhibition also showed a piece, on which Janssen and his colleague André Thomkins had pictured each other, together with Thomkins' aphorism "" (To not know all means forgive all).

In 1955, he married Marie Knauer and in 1956, had a second child, a daughter, Katrin (nicknamed Lamme). During this period, he worked on a series of large-scale color woodcuts that were displayed in his apartment in 1957. Janssen gained recognition and had an exhibition in Hanover in the Hans Brockstedt Gallery in 1957. After this successful show, he suddenly switched to etching, becoming a pupil of Paul Wunderlich, whom he later considered a rival. His marriage to Marie ended in divorce in 1959. His art was now influenced by art brut and Jean Dubuffet. A new marriage, to Birgit Sandner, was followed by a separation a few weeks later. The following year, 1960, he married Verena von Bethmann Hollweg who, in 1961, gave birth to his third child, a son named Philip.

Art Prize 
In 1964, Horst Janssen was awarded the Darmstadt Art Prize. Wieland Schmied, the director of the  praised him as "" ("the greatest draftsman besides Picasso. But Picasso is a different generation"). His works were seen in the tradition of Goya, Ensor, Klinger, Munch, Redon and Kubin. Titles included "" (Death Dance), "Idiot", "High Society", "" (Sloshed), a self-portrait, "" (Twist dancing hookers), "" (Klee and Ensor, arguing over a kipper, "" carrying the double meaning, both a smoked herring and a bowing) and "". The collection, the first major public display of his work, was also shown in Hamburg, Darmstadt, Berlin, Düsseldorf, Stuttgart, Munich and Basel.

His position as a respected artist was bolstered by winning Hamburg's Edwin Scharff Prize in 1966. The following year, two of the most important people of his youth died, his Aunt Anna and his teacher Alfred Mahlau. Janssen moved to Mühlenberger Weg in Blankenese. The following year, he was divorced from his third wife. His art now dealt with the losses of these years. He won first prize for graphic art at the 1968 Venice Biennale. He began a love affair with Gesche Tietjens. A trip with her to Svanshall, Skåne County, in southern Sweden led to many beautiful drawings of the coastlines. His concentration on landscapes was supported by his return to etching. In 1972, he separated from Tietjen, then pregnant with his child, Adam. In 1973, he had a love affair with Bettina Sartorius. In 1975, he won another prize, the Schiller Prize of the City of Mannheim, where his large drawing retrospective was organized in 1976. In 1977, his work was shown at the documenta VI in Kassel, in 1980 at the Art Institute of Chicago, in 1982 at Vienna's Albertina.

The city of Oldenburg made him an honorary citizen in 1992.

Horst Janssen died in Hamburg on 31 August 1995 and was buried in Oldenburg in Gertruden Cemetery.

Awards

Legacy
During Janssen's lifetime, his work was shown internationally, for example, in Basel (1966), London (1970), Zürich, Oslo, Göteborg (all in 1971), New York (1974), Turin (1975), Cambridge, Barcelona, Lugano (all 1976), Chicago (1980), travelling exhibition in Japan (1982), travelling exhibition in the U.S. (1983–1985) and Nowosibirsk (1985). More recently, his work has been shown at major museums, such as the Rembrandt House Museum in Amsterdam (2008). An exhibition at the Leopold Museum in Vienna in 2004, "Egon Schiele / Horst Janssen", explored his work in relation to the art of Egon Schiele.

In 2000, the Horst Janssen Museum, an art museum, was opened in Oldenburg. Special exhibitions there have explored his work in relation to other artists, such as Goya.

A biography,  (1984), was written by Stefan Blessin, who in 1992, added  ("Horst Janssen – From Darkness into Light"). In 2001, Janssen's friend Joachim Fest published  ("Horst Janssen. Self-Portrait in a Foreign Hand") and in 2006,  ("The Horrible Pleasure of the Eye. Memories of Horst Janssen"). Janssen's own memoirs were published in 2006 by Gesche Tietjens, titled  ("Summary of Summaries, a Book of Life Reader").

Catalogues
Wieland Schmied, Carl Vogel: Horst Janssen (with a catalogue of graphic art to 1965 by Carl Vogel), kestnergesellschaft 1965
, 1995, 
, 1995, 
Drawings and etchings,  Claude Bernard Gallery, New York, St. Gertrude, Hamburg, 1991, 
, 1999, 
, 1999, Janssen Kabinett , 
 Uwe Schneede: , St. Gertrude, Hamburg, 1995, 
, 1997, 
, 1998, 
, 2000, Horst Janssen Museum, 
, 2001, Horst Janssen Museum, 
, 2002, Horst Janssen Museum, 
, 2002, Horst Janssen Museum, 
, 2003, 
, 2003 Horst Janssen Museum, 
Egon Schiele – Horst Janssen, 2004, Horst Janssen Museum, 
 , 2005, Horst Janssen Museum, 
, "", 2008, Horst Janssen Museum, 
, Horst Janssen Sammlung Meyer-Schomann, 2008, Horst Janssen Museum, 
. , 2011, ISSN 2192-8401
, Verlag St. Gertrude, 1995,

References

External links
 
 Horst Janssen art directory
 Horst Janssen Ketterer Kunst
 Joachim Fest: Ein Mensch, wie ihn keine Fantasie erdenken konnte Berliner Zeitung 14 April 2001 
 Horst Janssen Museum Oldenburg / The many facets of a multitalented artist Horst Janssen Museum Oldenburg
 

1929 births
1995 deaths
German draughtsmen
German poster artists
German printmakers
Artists from Hamburg
Studienstiftung alumni
University of Fine Arts of Hamburg alumni